Dagmara Krzyżyńska (born 12 April 1981) is a Polish alpine skier. She competed in the women's giant slalom at the 2006 Winter Olympics.

References

1981 births
Living people
Polish female alpine skiers
Olympic alpine skiers of Poland
Alpine skiers at the 2006 Winter Olympics
People from Lower Silesian Voivodeship
Universiade gold medalists for Poland
Universiade medalists in alpine skiing
Competitors at the 2001 Winter Universiade
Competitors at the 2005 Winter Universiade
21st-century Polish women